Bark Camp Creek is a stream in the U.S. state of Georgia.

Bark Camp Creek was named for the "barkcamps" along its course, temporary settlements made with tree bark. Variant names are "Bark Camp Branch" and "Barkcamp Creek".

References

Rivers of Georgia (U.S. state)
Rivers of Burke County, Georgia
Rivers of Emanuel County, Georgia